Brandon John Larson (born May 24, 1976) is an American former professional baseball third baseman. He played in Major League Baseball (MLB) for the Cincinnati Reds. Larson won the MVP for the 1997 College World Series.

Career
After his successful  college season with the LSU Tigers, he was drafted by the Cincinnati Reds in the 1st round (14th overall) of the 1997 amateur entry draft. He had one of the most prolific years in college baseball history, his one year of NCAA Division 1 Baseball, where he hit 40 home runs and had 118 RBIs with a .381 batting average. (1997) 

He was signed by the Tampa Bay Devil Rays, then released at the end of  spring training, and then signed by the Texas Rangers, and batted .289 at Double-A, before being released mid-season. He was signed by the Washington Nationals before the  season, and batted .286 at Triple-A New Orleans. In , he was in Double-A Harrisburg, batting .232 and on June 27 was released.

On July 20, 2007, Larson signed with the Somerset Patriots of the Atlantic League, batting .333 with 27 RBI the rest of the season. In , he was selected to participate in the Atlantic League Home Run Derby and was elected to the All-star game.

References

External links

Sportsnet player stats
2008 Home Run Derby
MiLB.com player stats

1976 births
Living people
Cincinnati Reds players
Major League Baseball third basemen
People from San Angelo, Texas
Baseball players from Texas
Blinn Buccaneers baseball players
LSU Tigers baseball players
Chattanooga Lookouts players
Burlington Bees players
Rockford Reds players
Louisville RiverBats players
Louisville Bats players
Frisco RoughRiders players
New Orleans Zephyrs players
Somerset Patriots players
Harrisburg Senators players
College World Series Most Outstanding Player Award winners
All-American college baseball players